Keinton Mandeville or commonly referred to as Keinton is a village and civil parish in Somerset, England, situated on top of Combe Hill,  west of Castle Cary in the South Somerset district.  The village has a population of 1,215. It is located next to Barton St David.

The village is well know for its past history of quarrying and Blue Lias stone which is found locally in the region. And the birth of Henry Irving, the first actor to be knighted, a blue plaque is placed in high street where he was born to commemorate this.

History

At the time of the Domesday Book it was known as Chintone meaning the noble's enclosure from the Old English cyne and tun. The Mandeville part of the village's name came from Stephen de Mandeville around 1243.

The parish was previously called Keinton Mansfield. It was part of the hundred of Catsash.

Times Past In Keinton Mandeville shows an insight into life in the village from people who lived there. It contains old photos and information about the villages past.

The village was home to two banks Natwest and Lloyds. Which closed in the early 90s.

Keinton Mandeville once had a butcher,baker, blacksmith, ironmonger, wheelwright, carpenter, carrier, draper, hats and haberdashery, grocer, garage, even two banks, post office, two chapels, a policeman, railway, social club and 18 different stone quarries.

Keinton Mandeville railway station opened in 1905, but closed in 1964 due to beeching cuts.

On the 18 Feb 2023, 226 trees and shrubs were planted for the Queens Green Canopy project.

Governance

The parish council has responsibility for local issues, including setting an annual precept (local rate) to cover the council's operating costs and producing annual accounts for public scrutiny. The parish council evaluates local planning applications and works with the local police, district council officers, and neighbourhood watch groups on matters of crime, security, and traffic. The parish council's role also includes initiating projects for the maintenance and repair of parish facilities, as well as consulting with the district council on the maintenance, repair, and improvement of highways, drainage, footpaths, public transport, and street cleaning. Conservation matters (including trees and listed buildings) and environmental issues are also the responsibility of the council.

The village falls within the non-metropolitan district of South Somerset, which was formed on 1 April 1974 under the Local Government Act 1972, having previously been part of Langport Rural District. The district council is responsible for local planning and building control, local roads, council housing, environmental health, markets and fairs, refuse collection and recycling, cemeteries and crematoria, leisure services, parks, and tourism.

Somerset County Council is responsible for running the largest and most expensive local services such as education, social services, libraries, main roads, public transport, policing and fire services, trading standards, waste disposal and strategic planning.

The village is in the 'Northstone' electoral ward. The ward stretches north to Barton St. David and south to Kingsdon. The total population of the ward at the 2011 census was 3,005.

It is also part of the Somerton and Frome county constituency represented in the House of Commons of the Parliament of the United Kingdom. It elects one Member of Parliament (MP) by the first past the post system of election.

Places of interest 
 Keinton Mandeville school which provides education for 151 children. In the grounds is a listed dovecote.
 Lake View quarry which was used for the extraction of Blue Lias building stone (It has now been turned into a housing estate)
 The Three Old Castles Inn which was built in the late 18th century was a public house but has now closed and is a private house. 
 In the High Street is the Quarry Inn, the last remaining pub in the village.
 Village hall which was built in 1998.
 The MUGA (multi use games area) which was built in 2013.

Religious sites

The Church of St. Mary Magdalene dates from the 13th century and has been designated by English Heritage as a grade II listed building.

There is also a Weslyan Methodist Chapel which was built in 1843.

Notable residents
Irving House in Castle Street was the birthplace of actor Henry Irving. It is a Grade II listed building and has a bronze plaque which reads Here was born Henry Irving, Knight, Actor, 6th February 1838.

 Irving road built in the 1990s, was named after Irving.

References

External links

 Village web site
 Map of the village c. 1887

Villages in South Somerset
Civil parishes in Somerset